Robert Delbourgo BSc, ARCS, PhD, DSc, FAIP, FAA, (born 11 November 1940) is an Australian physicist, winner of the Walter Boas Medal in 1988.

Delbourgo was educated at the Imperial College of Science and Technology (BSc (Hons) 1960, PhD 1963) and University of London (DSc 1976). His PhD was obtained under the supervision of Abdus Salam (who won the Nobel Prize in Physics in 1979). Salam and Delbourgo have co-authored 30 research publications.

Delbourgo became a Research Associate, University of Wisconsin 1963 to 1964; Research Scientist, International Centre for Theoretical Physics 1964 to 1965; Lecturer in Physics, Imperial College 1966 to 1972, Reader 1972 to 1976; Professor of Physics, University of Tasmania 1976 to about 2001, Emeritus Professor from about 2001. Fellow, Australian Institute of Physics 1977; Fellow, Australian Academy of Science 1988; Walter Boas Medal, Australian Institute of Physics 1988; Lyle Medal, Australian Academy of Science 1989. Chairman, Tasmanian Branch, Australian Institute of Physics 1992 to 1993; Chairman, National Committee for Physics 1994 to 1997.

Selected publications
 Physics off the Beaten Track: A Selection of Papers by Robert Delbourgo, World Scientific, 2019.
 An Eventful Journey to Unification of All the Fundamental Forces, by Robert Delbourgo, World Scientific, 2020. A small book for science enthusiasts.
 "The relativity of space-time-property", by Robert Delbourgo, invited talk given at the Conference in Honour of the 90th Birthday of Freeman Dyson, Institute of Advanced Studies, Nanyang Technological University, Singapore, 26–29 August 2013

References

1940 births
Living people
Australian physicists
Theoretical physicists
Quantum physicists
Alumni of Imperial College London
Alumni of the University of London
Academic staff of the University of Tasmania
University of Wisconsin–Madison faculty
Fellows of the Australian Academy of Science
Fellows of the Australian Institute of Physics
Australian expatriates in the United Kingdom